The 1946 Drexel Dragons football team was an American football team that represented the Drexel Institute of Technology (renamed Drexel University in 1970) as an independent during the 1946 college football season. In their first season under head coach Ralph Chase, the Dragons compiled a 3–4 record and were outscored by a total of 109 to 76.

On October 26, Drexel played at Delaware in the last game to be played at Frazer Field.

On November 9, Drexel was scheduled to play against Dickinson, however Dickinson was unable to play because a bus which had all of the team's equipment was erroneously sent to Pittsburgh.  The error was discovered by the Dickinson football manager after the bus had left, and the bus was not flagged down until it had already reached Gettysburg, Pennsylvania.  By that time, the bus would be unable to reach Philadelphia, Pennsylvania, where the game was to be played, in time.  As a crowd of 2,000 fans awaited the game, Drexel attempted to outfit the Dickinson team with their spare equipment, however was unable to do so due to a lack of pads.  The game was canceled by mutual agreement.

Schedule

Roster

References

Drexel
Drexel Dragons football seasons
Drexel Dragons football